Mervin Durand (born 27 August 1960) is a Dominican cricketer. He played in one List A and four first-class matches for the Windward Islands from 1989 to 1991.

See also
 List of Windward Islands first-class cricketers

References

External links
 

1960 births
Living people
Dominica cricketers
Windward Islands cricketers